Totten Glacier is a large glacier draining a major portion of the East Antarctic Ice Sheet, through the Budd Coast of Wilkes Land in the Australian Antarctic Territory. Totten drains northeastward from the continental ice but turns northwestward at the coast where it terminates in a prominent tongue close east of Cape Waldron.

Totten Ice Shelf is a  floating portion of Totten Glacier, laterally bounded by the Aurora Subglacial Basin to the south and Law Dome to the north. Totten Ice Shelf is of glaciological interest because it buttresses the flow of grounded ice while coupling the ice basin to ocean processes such as ocean warming.

Totten Glacier Tongue is a small glacier tongue extending seaward from Totten Glacier. Delineated from air photos taken by U.S. Navy Operation Highjump (1946–47) and named by US-ACAN in association with Totten Glacier.

Melt
Totten Glacier drains the Aurora Subglacial Basin, which is largely grounded below sea level and is subject to marine ice sheet instability, meaning melt near the grounding line could lead to runaway glacier retreat and a significant contribution to sea level rise.

Surface altimetry measurements from Interferometric synthetic-aperture radar suggest that Totten Glacier lost mass from 1992 to 2006 and gravity measurements obtained by the Gravity Recovery and Climate Experiment satellite indicate mass loss has continued through at least 2016. The ICESat laser altimeter measured surface lowering of the grounded and floating portions of Totten Glacier from 2003 to 2009; however, longer term observations of the floating ice shelf show interannual variability of thickness and velocity.

Totten Glacier loses mass primarily through melt at its ice shelf base, and melt is influenced by the availability of ocean heat entering the cavity below the ice shelf. Warm, modified Circumpolar deep water enters the Totten Ice Shelf cavity through submarine canyons, driven by wind processes at the nearby continental shelf break. Wind processes and sea ice formation along the Sabrina Coast have been linked to variability in Totten Ice Shelf basal melt and calving rates.

See also
 Cape Mikhaylov
 Ice stream
 List of glaciers in the Antarctic
 List of Antarctic ice streams
 Retreat of glaciers since 1850

References

Ice streams of Antarctica
Glaciers of Wilkes Land